Jochen Hägele (born 1975) is a German film and television actor. Specializes also in French dubbing, he is the voice-over artist of Daniel Brühl.

Early life
Jochen Hägele is born in 1975 in Stuttgart, Germany. In 1976, his family moved in France, he learned also the French language.
He trained in drama from 1993 to 1996 at the Cours Florent in Paris.

He moved to Paris in 1995.

Career
He has appeared in over 40 television and feature films. He acts in German, French and English.
He plays the role of Stilson in Virtual Revolution, a science fiction film directed and written by Guy-Roger Duvert, which won several awards including best picture at the Los Angeles Independent Film Festival. He features with actress Fanny Ardent in the television period drama series Resistance.

Filmography

Film
 Le Village des ombres (2010) - Klaus Froelich
 Eyjafjallajökull (2013) – Agent Avis Allemagne
 Chinese Puzzle (2013) – German philosopher Hegel
 96 hours (2014) – Sacha
 Picnic in Gaza (2014) – Voice
 House of Time (2015) - Hans Kammler
 Virtual Revolution (2016) – Stilson
 L'ascension (2017) – Emmerich
 Nos patriotes (2017) - Lieutenant Muller
 The Sisters Brothers (2018) - Horse Dealer Town #3
 Mes jours de gloire (2020) - Gerd
 Hard Skills (2021) - Paul Olivier (Post-production)

Television
 Un village français (2009-2014) - Ludwig (18 episodes)
 Transporter: The Series (2012) - Jurgen
 Resistance (2014) – Doering
 A Very Secret Service (2015) - Captain Otto Schmidt
 Ein Fall für zwei (2017) - Peter Arnold
 Mordshunger – Verbrechen und andere Delikatessen (2019) - Werner Immenbach
 Un si grand soleil (2019) - Jerome Lorin (40 episodes)
 Weil du mir gehörst (2019, TVfilm) - Martin Wolters
 Ma mère, le véto (2019) - Pierre DuBois (2 episodes)
 Baron Noir (2020) - Klaus Fischtel (4 episodes)
 Rauhantekijä (2020) - Saksan ulkoministeri (3 episodes)
 Tell Me Who I Am (2020-present) - Kleist (9 episodes)

Roles

Live action
 Daniel Brühl (French version)
 Rush (2013) - Niki Lauda
 Woman in Gold (2015) - Hubertus Czernin
 Burnt (2015) - Tony
 Colonia (2015) - Daniel
 The Zookeeper's Wife (2017) - Lutz Heck
 The Alienist (2018) - Dr Laszlo Kreizler
 Entebbe (2018) - Wilfried Böse
 All Quiet on the Western Front (2022) - Matthias Erzberger

 1899 (2022) - Eyk Larsen (Andreas Pietschmann)

Animation 
 Bleach (French version) : Tōshirō Hitsugaya, Yumichika Ayasegawa, Kaname Tōsen, Zangetsu (Ichigo's Zanpakutō Spirit)

References

External links

Showreel of Jochen Hägele

Living people
Male actors from Paris
German male film actors
1975 births